Mikhail Vladimirovich Svetov (born January 4, 1985) is a Russian politician and public figure, chairman of the civil society movement "Civil Society", political scientist, blogger, one of the main ideologists and popularizers of libertarianism in Russia, organizer major federal rallies on various political and public topics. Svetov hosts his own YouTube channel and an online newspaper both entitled "SVTV".

Biography 
Svetov was born in Moscow to medical students. Svetov describes his family as being classical liberals when he was growing up. From the third grade on, he was homeschooled by his family, with the exception for one year spent at Appleby College in Canada at the age of 15. In 2004, when he was 19 years old, Svetov almost joined the National Bolshevik Party. 

From 2004 to 2006 Svetov studied at the Russian State University for the Humanities. From there he transferred to the University of Nottingham and graduated in 2009 with a degree in Political Science. According to his own statement, Svetov is fluent in English, French and Japanese.

In the UK, Svetov began blogging in LiveJournal. The first mention of libertarianism appeared on his blog in 2005 when Svetov was 20 years old. Although, as the politician claims, he has always been an "ardent libertarian." Shortly before leaving for Japan, while in Moscow, Svetov joined the Libertarian Party.

In 2010, Svetov left for Japan where he learned Japanese and also sold souvenirs on the Internet. It was there that Svetov first invested in Bitcoin, which became the key to his material well-being. In 2011 Svetov was interviewed as an eyewitness by Russia-1 about the 2011 Tōhoku earthquake and the subsequent Fukushima Daiichi nuclear disaster.

In 2016 he graduated from the New Zealand Film Academy. A short film, “Jackpot”, was written by Svetov and released in New Zealand, winning first place in the state script competition and received sponsorship for a feature length adaptation. For some time, Svetov worked in the film industry.

Political activity 
In 2016, after returning to Russia from Japan, Svetov began his socio-political activities. He helped in the election campaign of Vera Kichanova and Andrei Shalnev. Helped with the organization of the eighth readings of Adam Smith. He organized the visit of Director of the Cato Institute Peter Goetler to read. He organized meetings and helped with the translation of the speeches of foreign guests. 

Svetov was the organizer of opposition rallies: “For Free Internet” on August 26, 2017, a rally against the blocking of Telegram in Russia on April 30, 2018, a rally against pension reform on July 29, 2018. He initiated a public campaign against the "law of Klishas" on the “sovereign Internet” and launched a petition against the adoption of this law, which collected 122 thousand signatures. Svetov also became one of the organizers of the rally in defense of the Internet in Moscow on March 10, 2019, and also spoke at it. Similar rallies also took place in Khabarovsk and Voronezh. After that, the Kremlin’s Telegram channels began to spread an “investigation” about the fact that the real customer of the rally was the video blogger PewDiePie.

In May 2018, Svetov presented the flag of Russian libertarianism – the Gadsden snake against the background of the Russian national tricolor of 1914. According to Svetov’s idea, this flag was to become a universal symbol for all libertarians of Russia, combining the political and philosophical convictions of the supporters of freedom with patriotism and Russian national culture.

From time to time, Svetov acts as the organizer of “Conservative Anime Parties”, where in an informal atmosphere visitors can watch anime, fry burgers, listen to music, discuss politics and listen to a lecture by an invited lecturer. 

On January 18, 2018, Svetov debated with Vladimir Milov on the topic of the presidential campaign of Alexei Navalny and came out the winner according to the results of the ballot. In August, Svetov met and talked with US Republican Senator Rand Paul.

After the adviser to the Ukrainian president Volodymyr Zelenskyy, Ruslan Stefanchuk, stated that the ideology of the "Servant of the People" party was libertarianism, Svetov issued a text questioning the party’s commitment to libertarian values and, at the request of RTVI, made a small test for understanding libertarianism for Zelenskyy himself.

Svetov acted as the inviting organizer of the lecture of Hans-Hermann Hoppe. The lecture was held on October 6, 2019, in Moscow, where Hoppe described the destructive power of democracy, its incompatibility with individual freedom and the natural union between Western conservatism and libertarianism. Svetov also spoke at the event.

Political views

Libertarianism 
Svetov calls himself an ideological anarcho-capitalist. He believes that only through lustration and ensuring the functioning of the free market can corruption and the economic decline of Russia be overcome. In addition, Svetov is a supporter of such ideas as: federalism, freedom of association, laissez-faire, legalization of weapons, drugs and abortion and reducing the role of the state in the life of a child such eliminating juvenile justice and increasing the ability of private foundations to directly help children.

Right conservatism 
Svetov identifies himself with cultural conservatism. He stands for traditional relations and the separation of gender roles in the family. According to Svetov, the family was unjustly scolded by the left, and third-wave feminism which did a disservice to women, making them more miserable. According to Svetov, he would like to live in a homogeneous society somewhere in Kamchatka, having acquired a ranch and a large family.

Civic nationalism 
Svetov would like Russia to cease to be the multinational state that Yeltsin made it, and become a national state according to the principle of Switzerland – “they speak four languages, live four different nations, practice different religions, but at the same time everyone lives in peace and harmony; they are Swiss, and we are Russia”. As a civic nationalist, Svetov is a supporter of building a Russian civil nation and reviving the tradition of Russian identity.

Education 
Having been homeschooled himself, Svetov has named homeschooling "the best thing that ever happened to him in his formative years." He opposes compulsory education in public schools, seeing them as a threat to each family's right to privacy. Apart from his advocacy for homeschooling and education within a family, he supports school choice and a voucher system of funding for primary and secondary education, due to its emphasis on each individual rather than a particular public school entity. Svetov has named the United States and Russia as the two most liberal countries in regards to homeschooling legislation.

Attitude to other political organizations 
Svetov criticizes the activities of parties and movements, which he calls pseudo-opposition, such as “Yabloko”, PARNAS, Left Front, Democratic Choice, Party of Growth.

As of 2021, Svetov sees only Alexei Navalny and the Anti-Corruption Fund as the only ally in the struggle against government in Russia, but he would be glad to see other sincere opposition forces, regardless of their political orientation.

Incidents 
On April 30, 2018, he spoke at a rally in Moscow in support of the Telegram messenger, and called for lustrations. He believes that because of this appeal, some media outlets ("Medusa", "Rain" and Znak.com) did not cite his speech and also mention him as the organizer of the rally, as they were preparing for the next “change in the position of the nomenclature”.

On September 20, 2018 in Saint Petersburg, Svetov was subjected to a failed attempt at an armed attack. During the meeting, one of the members of the LPR regional branch who was present at her, after a short skirmish with Svetov, took out a knife and attempted to attack him. Following the results of the proceedings on this incident, the LPR member who attempted the attack was expelled from the party for violating the Charter. Also, following the results of the proceedings on September 27, 2018, at an extraordinary meeting of the LPR Federal Committee, some representatives of the governing and audit bodies of the Saint Petersburg regional branch were excluded, acquitting the aggressor, accusing Svetov of provoking aggression and convicted of external control of the branch, systematic lying to party members and provoking a split inside branches.

In July 2019, the Ukrainian Mirotvorets website introduced Svetov to the list of people posing a threat to the national security of Ukraine in connection with his trip to the Crimea to his girlfriend

References 

Russian libertarians
Russian bloggers
1985 births
Living people
Anarcho-capitalists
Libertarianism in Russia
Russian YouTubers
Russian politicians
Russian political scientists
Russian activists
Russian State University for the Humanities alumni
Alumni of the University of Nottingham
Russian activists against the 2022 Russian invasion of Ukraine
People listed in Russia as foreign agents